Republic Square, formerly Lenin Square, is a Yerevan Metro station. It was opened to the public on 26 December 1981.

Gallery

References

Yerevan Metro stations
Railway stations opened in 1981
1981 establishments in Armenia